Stenurella is a genus of beetles in the family Cerambycidae.

Species
 Stenurella approximans (Rosenhauer, 1856)
 Stenurella bifasciata (O.F. Müller, 1776)
 Stenurella hybridula (Reitter, 1901)
 Stenurella jaegeri (Hummel, 1825)
 Stenurella lindbergi (Villiers, 1943)
 Stenurella melanura (Linnaeus, 1758)
 Stenurella nigra (Linnaeus, 1758)
 Stenurella novercalis (Reitter, 1901)
 Stenurella pamphyliae Rapuzzi & Sama, 2009
 Stenurella samai Rapuzzi, 1995
 Stenurella septempunctata (Fabricius, 1793)
 Stenurella vaucheri (Bedel, 1900)

References
 Biolib
 Bezark, Larry G. A Photographic Catalog of the Cerambycidae of the World Stenurella Genus
 Cerambycoidea.com

Lepturinae
Cerambycidae genera